Frank Ernest Burton (18 March 1865 – 10 February 1948) was an English international footballer, who played as an inside right.

Career
Born in Nottingham, Burton played professionally for Nottingham Forest, and earned one cap for England in 1889.

References

External links

1865 births
1948 deaths
English footballers
England international footballers
Nottingham Forest F.C. players
English Football League players
Association football inside forwards